Cyptochirus is a genus of Scarabaeidae or scarab beetles.

References

Scarabaeidae genera